The Growing Pains Movie is a 2000 American made-for-television comedy film and is the first of two reunion films based on the 1985–1992 sitcom Growing Pains. It premiered on ABC November 5, 2000 as a two-hour episode of The Wonderful World of Disney anthology series.

Plot 
Eight years later, Mike is married with four kids and now a successful ad executive who is a vice president; Carol is a very successful Wall Street lawyer; Ben cleans pools; and Chrissy is a 17-year-old high school student with a smoking habit and who is still a good student. Chrissy goes to work with Maggie, but soon Maggie is fired. She decides to enter the election campaign herself and run against her old boss. During the campaign, Carol meets the other campaign manager, Scott Coffer, and falls in love with him and his 10-year-old son Jack. However, Carol realizes dating him could put her mom's campaign in jeopardy, so she breaks up with him. Knowing his father had real feelings for Carol, Jack takes matters into his own hands and asks her brother Mike to come up with a scheme to get Carol and his dad back together again. Mike agrees because he saw how happy his sister was with Scott. At the end of the movie, Maggie wins the election, and Carol and Scott get married.

Cast

Main 
 Alan Thicke as Jason Seaver
 Joanna Kerns as Maggie Malone Seaver
 Kirk Cameron as Mike Seaver
 Tracey Gold as Carol Seaver
 Jeremy Miller as Ben Seaver
 Ashley Johnson as Chrissy Seaver
 Chelsea Noble as Kate MacDonald-Seaver
 Brandon Douglas as Scott Coffer
 Matthew Harbour as Jack Coffer

Guest 
 Francis Xavier McCarthy as Mac Robinson

Featuring
 John Moore as Timothy James
 Simon Peacock as Staffer
 Teresa Esmezyan as Eve Seaver
 Marlyne Afflack as Jody
 Danny Wells as Street Person
 Tracy Braunstein as Carol's Assistant
 Mike Shute as 1st Policeman
 Peter Colvey as Mr. Trotter
 Marine St-Cyr as Nikki
 Andreya Sullivan as Dandreena
 Noel Burton as Director
 Michelle Lipper as Assistant Director
 Miriam Samuels as Tea Lady #1
 Una Kay as Tea Lady #2
 Mary Morter as Sweet Old Lady
 Terry Simpson as Crew Member #1
 Shawn Roberts as Crew Member #2
 Jennifer Marcil as Young Woman Golfer
 Carol Spooner as Gospel Choir #1
 Annette Mocrieffe as Gospel Choir #2
 Kassandra Dasent as Gospel Choir #3
 Roger Moore Lodge as Gospel Choir #4
 Stefin Noel as Gospel Choir #5

Home media
On December 6, 2011, Warner Archive Collection released The Growing Pains Movie along with Growing Pains: Return of the Seavers on DVD in Region 1.

References

External links 
 

2000 television films
2000 films
2000 comedy films
American comedy television films
Television series reunion films
Films based on television series
Walt Disney anthology television series episodes
Growing Pains
Television films based on television series
Films directed by Alan Metter
2000s English-language films
2000s American films